Oakmont is an unincorporated community and coal town located in Mineral County, West Virginia, United States. Oakmont is located on Abram Creek.

A variant name was Oakdale.

References 

Unincorporated communities in Mineral County, West Virginia
Unincorporated communities in West Virginia
Coal towns in West Virginia